Nauru competed at the 2022 Commonwealth Games in Birmingham, England from 28 July to 8 August 2022. It was Nauru's ninth appearance at the Games.

Christon Amram and Maximina Uepa were the country's opening ceremony flagbearers. 

Nauru won one bronze medal, ranking the county a tied 40th on the medal table. Flagbearer and weightlifter Maximina Uepa won the bronze medal in the women's 76 kg event. This continued the island nation's streak of winning at least one medal at each edition of the games it has competed in since its debut in 1990.

Competitors
The following is the list of number of competitors participating at the Games per sport/discipline.

Medallists

| style="text-align:left; vertical-align:top;"|

Athletics

Men
Track and road events

Field events

Women
Track and road events

Boxing

Men

Judo

Men

Weightlifting

Nauru qualified 4 weightlifters (two per gender). The four qualified through their respective Commonwealth Weightlifting ranking as of 28 February 2022.

Men

Women

Wrestling

References

External links
Birmingham 2022 Commonwealth Games Official site

Nations at the 2022 Commonwealth Games
Nauru at the Commonwealth Games
2022 in Nauruan sport